Ola is an unincorporated community and census-designated place in Brule County, South Dakota, United States. The population was 15 according to the 2020 census.

Demographics

References

Census-designated places in South Dakota